The Hork-Bajir Chronicles is the second companion book to the Animorphs series, written by K. A. Applegate. With respect to continuity within the series, it takes place before book #23, The Pretender, although the events told in the story occur between the time of The Ellimist Chronicles and The Andalite Chronicles. The book is introduced by Tobias, who flies to the valley of the free Hork-Bajir, where Jara Hamee tells him the story of how the Yeerks enslaved the Hork-Bajir, and how Aldrea, an Andalite, and her companion, Dak Hamee, a Hork-Bajir, tried to save their world from the invasion. Jara Hamee's story is narrated from the points of view of Aldrea, Dak Hamee, and Esplin 9466, alternating in similar fashion to the Megamorphs books.

Background

The Hork-Bajir Chronicles is one of the most unusual novels in the Animorphs series because, like The Ellimist Chronicles (which is also a book ended with a scene involving one of the Animorphs), it has an almost complete lack of human characters (Tobias, who appears in the prologue and epilogue, is human, albeit trapped in hawk morph).

Although the moral implications of war are a common theme in the Animorphs series, The Hork-Bajir Chronicles is one of the novels in that series that deals most heavily with that theme (such as the loss of innocence during the battle on the Hork-Bajir homeworld and war crimes being committed by the usually honorable Andalites). It describes a peaceful world that is torn apart by violence. While clear divisions of good and evil exist in the Animorphs series, K.A. Applegate has stated that she wanted to write The Hork-Bajir Chronicles to show that "most stories of conflict are more complicated than any one side would have you believe." The ghostwriter and spouse of Applegate, Michael Grant, likewise said during a Reddit AMA, "Hork-Bajir Chronicles was neat because it was basically a Vietnam parable. We even incorporated a version of the famous line, 'We had to destroy the village in order to save it.' HBC was history and politics and philosophy snuck into a kids' book about monsters in trees."

The Blade Ship, Visser Three's personal ship, is built during the time of these chronicles and plays a constant role in the series. The ship is shaped like a medieval ax with the bridge in the handle and twin scimitar-like wings that form the blade.

Plot summary
In the Earth year 1968, Aldrea and her family come to live on the Hork-Bajir homeworld after her father – formerly Prince – Seerow, is relieved of duty by Alloran and many other Andalites in 1966, who feel he is no longer fit to command them. This is mainly due to his peaceful philosophy towards the Yeerks, which has resulted in the Yeerks' enslavement of many other species.

On the Hork-Bajir homeworld, two Hork-Bajir, Dak Hamee and his friend Jagil Hullan make contact with Aldrea's family, and Aldrea makes friends with Dak. Dak is a seer, meaning he possesses intelligence greater than most others of his species. Aldrea's mother, a biologist, is fascinated with the reptilian, tree-dwelling, peaceful Hork-Bajir, as well as with the other life on the planet. Aldrea herself begins to learn more about Hork-Bajir culture from Dak, and he in turn learns about Andalites.

But then tragedy strikes in the form of a Yeerk invasion. Aldrea's entire family is killed, but she escapes—barely—along with Dak. Dak is sickened by his first taste of violence when they are forced to fight Yeerks and Gedd-Controllers.  The Yeerks arrive at the enormous tree where the other members of Dak's tribe live, and proceed to enslave every single Hork-Bajir they find.

Aldrea and Dak, meanwhile, continue to flee the Yeerks, and they journey down into Father Deep, a huge chasm (the Hork-Bajir believe they were born from Father Deep and Mother Sky). There they meet the Arn, a powerful but arrogant race who created the Hork-Bajir, as well as many other creatures that inhabit their planet. Aldrea convinces the Arn that it is in their best interest to fight back against the Yeerks. Aldrea also urges Dak to round up the remaining Hork-Bajir and train them to fight.

Eventually, Dak does so, and he and Aldrea then lead their Hork-Bajir army, along with various monsters and terrifying creatures created by the Arn, against the Yeerks on the ground. In the ensuing bloodbath, Aldrea is disgusted by the carnage, and Dak blames Aldrea for turning his people from innocence and peacefulness towards violence. Dak becomes more distant with Aldrea.

After many months, an attack force of Andalite ships appears, though not enough to fight off all the Yeerks. The Andalites, including Alloran, now a powerful leader, join Dak and Aldrea on the ground and take part in their campaign of guerilla warfare against the Yeerks.  As their numbers began to dwindle, Alloran becomes desperate and finally resorts to using a biological weapon, a virus which will kill all Hork-Bajir, from the Hork-Bajir-Controllers (whose bodies are being controlled by Yeerks) to all the free Hork-Bajir still alive on the planet.

When Aldrea realizes what is about to happen, she betrays Alloran and her fellow Andalites in order to help Dak destroy the virus before it can be employed.  In the resulting conflict, the virus is accidentally released into the environment.  Aldrea, who had morphed into a female Hork-Bajir (who is actually Delf Hajool, the wife of Jagil Hullan) during the struggle, willingly stays too long in that form and is thus trapped as a Hork-Bajir nothlit. She and Dak realize their love for each other, and the two become a mated pair. They eventually produce a son named Seerow and go to live in the deep valleys, where the toxin will not reach for some time. At least one of their descendants will eventually become a founding member of the small Hork-Bajir colony on Earth.

About 30 Earth years later, Jara Hamee, Dak and Aldrea's grandson, tells the story of the Yeerk invasion of the Hork-Bajir homeworld to Tobias. Sitting around a campfire at night with other Hork-Bajir, Jara reveals at the end of his story that he and his kalashi, Ket Halpak, have named their daughter Toby after Tobias. Responding to Tobias' comment that it is a strange name for a Hork-Bajir, Jara comments that Toby (like her great-grandfather) is different. As Tobias begins to fly away the next morning, he pauses to ask <When you say Toby is different...,> and Toby (still only four feet tall at this point) replies to him "Yes, Tobias, friend of the Hork-Bajir. Yes, I am different." Tobias is happy to know that she is a seer just like Dak Hamee. (Note: Dak and Aldrea's story would later be extended somewhat further in Animorphs #34, The Prophecy.)

Morphs

References

See also

Animorphs books
1998 novels
1998 science fiction novels
Biological weapons in popular culture
Novels set on fictional planets
Fiction set in 1968
Prequel novels
Novels with multiple narrators